Alejandro Cruz Ortiz (May 3, 1921 – March 8, 2007) was a Mexican Luchador (professional wrestler), known worldwide as Black Shadow. Cruz's mask vs. mask match against El Santo in 1952 is generally considered one of the most important matches in the history of Lucha Libre. Cruz often teamed with Blue Demon, working as a tag team called "Los Hermanos Shadow" (the Shadow Brothers), even though the two were not related. He was nicknamed El Hombre de Goma, translated as The Rubber Man, due to his elasticity and flexibility in the ring.

Biography
Cruz's original ambition was to be a musician but because he lacked the talent to earn a living from it he turned to professional wrestling. He had been a lifelong fan, and began training for a professional wrestling career in 1941.

Professional wrestling career
Cruz made his professional debut on June 21, 1942, against Rito Romero losing his debut match. Initially he was billed as "Jungla" Cruz, named after a popular character from the funny papers but he did not like the name the promoters had forced on him. After making his debut Cruz realized that he needed to perform regularly in order to improve, thus he decided to move to Monterrey which at the time was one of the main cities for wrestling in Mexico. In Monterrey he befriended another young wrestler trying to break into the business, Blue Demon. The two struck up a friendship and soon after began teaming together on a regular basis. After working under his real name for a while, Cruz decided that he needed a different image, and came up with the ring persona "Black Shadow" and a black mask with white trim around the eye, mouth and nose openings. The new image was a hit and masked duo of Blue Demon and Black Shadow became known as "Los Hermanos Shadow" (Spanish for "the shadow brothers") despite not being related. Los Hermanos Shadow quickly became very popular and were at one point the main "tecnico" (good guy) team. In the mid-1950s Los Hermanos Shadow began a decade long rivalry with the top Rudo (villain) team of El Santo and Gory Guerrero, known as "La Pareja Atómica". After selling out arenas all around Mexico for their tag team matches El Santo and Black Shadow started to work singles matches against each other.

Losing the mask
The rivalry between Black Shadow and El Santo culminated in a Luchas de Apuestas, or mask vs. mask match, on November 7, 1952. The 70 minute match that is still heralded today as one of the most famous in Latin American history. It helped popularize the concept with mask matches still the biggest draws in Lucha Libre to the modern day. Subsequently Santo clashed with Blue Demon but it was the match against Black Shadow that stands out as one of the defining matches in Lucha Libre history. The match was one of the main reasons wrestling promoter Salvador Lutteroth started to build Arena Mexico as so many people had been unable to get tickets for the show. The match was so popular that it caused El Santo to turn tecnico and was the starting point of a wrestling and movie career that made El Santo Mexico's most beloved wrestler.

While some wrestlers lose popularity after unmasking, Black Shadow thrived after losing his mask. His innovative, high-flying style that incorporated moves off the top rope was something not many wrestlers used at the time and ensured that he worked in the main event throughout the 1950s and 1960s. In 1981 Cruz was unable to get his wrestling license renewed due to ailing health, forcing him to retire after almost 40 years in the business. After his retirement Cruz withdrew from the spotlight, rarely talking about his career. In 2001 Black Shadow was inducted in the Wrestling Observer Newsletter Hall of Fame for his contributions to professional wrestling.

Filmography
Cruz also appeared in numerous Mexican wrestling films with Santo, mostly billed as "Black Shadow" in the credits. In two Blue Demon films, (Blue Demon en Noche de muerte and Santo y Blue Demon contra los monstruos) the Black Shadow played an evil duplicate (or clone) of Blue Demon, dressed in the Blue Demon costume while posing as the "real" Blue Demon.

Death
Alejandro Cruz died on March 8, 2007, age 85, in Mexico City after suffering from pneumonia.

Championships and accomplishments
Empresa Mexicana de Lucha Libre
Mexican National Lightweight Championship (1 time)
Mexican National Tag Team Championship (1 time) – with Blue Demon
Wrestling Observer Newsletter
Wrestling Observer Newsletter Hall of Fame (Class of 2001)

Luchas de Apuestas record

References

General sources

Specific

External links
 Online World of Wrestling profile

1921 births
2007 deaths
Deaths from pneumonia in Mexico
Mexican male film actors
Mexican male professional wrestlers
Professional wrestlers from Guanajuato
Sportspeople from León, Guanajuato
20th-century professional wrestlers
Mexican National Tag Team Champions